Junior MasterChef Swaad Ke Ustaad is the Indian version of Junior MasterChef. It aired on 17 August 2013 and ended on 2 November 2013.

The judges for the show were Vikas Khanna, Kunal Kapur and Chef Jolly.

Sarthak Bhardwaj  of Dehradun was the winner of this show.

Format
Ten contestants ages 9–12 were chosen to participate. The auditions process began as MasterChef India 3 concluded.

The Top 10 contestants were also taken to Adlabs Imagica theme park to celebrate.

Contestants

References

External links
 

Indian game shows
2013 Indian television series debuts
StarPlus original programming
MasterChef India
Reality television spin-offs
Indian television spin-offs
Indian television series based on British television series
Indian cooking television series
Television series about children